Daniele "Dani" Neuhaus Turnes (born 21 March 1993) is a Brazilian professional footballer who plays as a goalkeeper for Portuguese club Famalicão and the Brazil women's national team.

Club career
As a talented childhood volleyball player, Neuhaus found that she could use some of the same skills as a football goalkeeper. She began her football career with Scorpions de Florianópolis, where she was noticed by youth national team scouts. This brought her to the attention of bigger clubs and she played for Foz Cataratas and Vitória das Tabocas, before joining Santos in April 2015.

In January 2018, Neuhaus was announced as the first ever signing for S.L. Benfica's newly formed women's football team. She left Benfica at the end of her contract in June 2021, having collected Second Division, First Division and Portuguese Cup winners' medals. Three weeks later she joined Famalicão, who were coached by her compatriot Jorge Barcellos.

International career
Neuhaus represented Brazil's youth team at the inaugural 2008 FIFA U-17 Women's World Cup in New Zealand and at the 2010 FIFA U-17 Women's World Cup in Trinidad and Tobago. After graduating to the under-20 team, she played at the 2012 FIFA U-20 Women's World Cup.

National coach Emily Lima called Neuhaus into the senior Brazil squad for the first time in June 2017. At the following month's 2017 Tournament of Nations, she played in Brazil's third and final game, a 6–1 defeat by Australia. Neuhaus played in two further friendly defeats by Australia in September 2017, 2–1 and 3–2, when first choice goalkeeper Bárbara was injured.

Neuhaus retained her place in the national squad when Vadão returned to the head coach position and named his squad for the 2017 Yongchuan International Tournament in October.

Personal life
Neuhaus studied physiotherapy at Universidade Santa Cecília (UNISANTA).

Honours
Benfica
 Campeonato Nacional Feminino: 2020–21
 Campeonato Nacional II Divisão Feminino: 2018–19
 Taça de Portugal: 2018–19
 Taça da Liga: 2019–20
Supertaça de Portugal: 2019

References

External links
 
 Agent profile

1993 births
Living people
Brazilian women's footballers
Brazil women's international footballers
Brazilian expatriate women's footballers
Brazilian expatriate sportspeople in Portugal
Campeonato Nacional de Futebol Feminino players
Expatriate women's footballers in Portugal
Sportspeople from Santa Catarina (state)
Women's association football goalkeepers
Associação Desportiva Centro Olímpico players
S.L. Benfica (women) footballers
Santos FC (women) players
Brazilian people of German descent
F.C. Famalicão (women) players
Associação Acadêmica e Desportiva Vitória das Tabocas players